Michał Rajkowski (born 17 December 1984) is a Polish motorcycle speedway rider.

Career
In 2007, Rajkowski signed for the Newport Wasps and then in 2008, he rode in the highest tier of British speedway for the Belle Vue Aces. The following season (2009) he rode for the Edinburgh Monarchs and Polonia Piła in the Polish Liga II.

In 2010, he rode for Berwick Bandits and Stoke Potters before joining the Glasgow Tigers in the 2011 British Premier League. His last appearance in Britain was during 2012, when he made a handful of starts for the Redcar Bears.

References

1984 births
Living people
Polish speedway riders
Belle Vue Aces riders
Berwick Bandits riders
Edinburgh Monarchs riders
Glasgow Tigers riders
Mildenhall Fen Tigers riders
Newport Wasps riders
Stoke Potters riders
People from Skwierzyna
Sportspeople from Lubusz Voivodeship